Carinapex albarnesi is a species of sea snails, a marine gastropod mollusc in the family Horaiclavidae.

Description
The length of the shell attains 4.8 mm.

Distribution
This marine species occurs off Japan, Taiwan and the Philippines

References

 Wiedrick S.G. (2015). Review of the genus Carinapex Dall, 1924 with the description of ten new species (Gastropoda: Conoidea: Horaiclavidae) from the Pacific Ocean. The Festivus. 47(1): 5–28. page(s): 6, pl. 1 figs 9-12

External links
 

albarnesi
Gastropods described in 2015